Lars Petersen (born 3 September 1965 in Haderslev) is a Danish-born dressage rider, who has been competing internationally for the United States since 2017. He competed for Denmark at the 1996 Summer Olympics, where he placed 12th in the individual dressage competition. He won two bronze medals at the European Championships in team dressage.

At the 2002 FEI Dressage World Cup Final in 's-Hertogenbosch, he finished 2nd with a score of 79.670% on his horse Cavan. He has also qualified for the 2014 Dressage World Cup Final in Lyon, France, after winning the North American League. He was forced to withdraw, however, after his horse sustained a hoof injury.

References

Living people
1965 births
American male equestrians
Danish male equestrians
Danish dressage riders
American dressage riders
Olympic equestrians of Denmark
Equestrians at the 1996 Summer Olympics